"Rudebox" is song by English musician Robbie Williams from his seventh studio album of the same name (2006). It interpolates the 1987 song "Boops (Here to Go)" by Sly and Robbie. The single was released on 4 September 2006, although download purchases allowed it to reach number 30 on the UK Singles Chart on 3 September. After the release of the CD single, it ascended 26 places to number four, selling 24,821 copies.

The track was nominated for the 2006 Ivor Novello Award. In the song Williams makes several cultural references including Adidas, T.K. Maxx (in a joke about product placement, "T.K. Maxx costs less!"), Michael Jackson, Special Olympics, Durex condoms, The Matrix and Mandrax.

Commercial performance
"Rudebox" had considerable success in Europe, peaking at number two on the European Hot 100 Singles chart. The single reached number one in Germany, Italy, and Switzerland and entered the top 10 in several other countries around the world. In the United Kingdom, the single debuted at number 30 based on downloads alone; when the single was physically released, it climbed to its peak of number four on the UK Singles Chart, spending two weeks inside the top 10 and nine weeks on the chart overall. In Mexico, the song won the award for Song of the Year – International at the 2007 Premios Oye! ceremony.

Track listings
UK CD1 and European CD single
 "Rudebox" (radio edit)
 "Lonestar Rising"

UK CD2 and Australian CD single
 "Rudebox" (album version)
 "Rudebox" (Soul Mekanik dub)
 "Rudebox" (Chicken Lips Malfunction)
 "Rudebox" (Chicken Lips Malfunction dub)
 "Rudebox" (video)
 "Rudebox" (interview clip)

Credits and personnel
Credits are taken from the Rudebox album booklet.

Studios
 Recorded at Wendy House Studios (London, England)
 Mixed at Twenty One Studios (London, England)
 Mastered at Metropolis Studios (London, England)

Personnel

 Robbie Williams – writing, lead vocals, backing vocals
 Kelvin Andrews – writing, backing vocals, Moog, sythesisers, programming
 Danny Spencer – writing, backing vocals, Moog, sythesisers, programming
 Bill Laswell – writing ("Boops (Here to Go)")
 Carl Aiken – writing ("Boops (Here to Go)")
 William Collins – writing ("Boops (Here to Go)")
 Sly Dunbar – writing ("Boops (Here to Go)")
 Robbie Shakespeare – writing ("Boops (Here to Go)")
 Charmaine Baines – featured vocals
 Marsha Thomason – featured vocals
 Richard Scott – backing vocals
 Soul Mekanik – production
 Jeremy Wheatley – mixing
 Matt Kemp – engineering
 Tony Cousins – mastering

Charts

Weekly charts

Year-end charts

References

2006 songs
2006 singles
Robbie Williams songs
Chrysalis Records singles
Number-one singles in Germany
Number-one singles in Italy
Number-one singles in Switzerland
Number-one singles in Turkey
Songs written by Bootsy Collins
Songs written by Robbie Williams